Inga Linnéa Landgré (born Lundgren; 6 August 1927) is a Swedish actress who has worked in theatre, television and films since the 1940s.

Early life and career
Inga Landgré was born in Stockholm on 6 August 1927. Her father was a struggling musician whose alcoholism strained her parents' marriage. Her mother was a waitress. They divorced in the early 1930s, when she was only five years old. She was an only child. She received her theatrical education in Calle Flygare Teaterskola and made her acting debut in 1944 at the Blanche Theatre as Anja in "Körbärsträdgården".

She started appearing in motion pictures around this time as well, starting with the 1943 film Ordet. In 1946, she starred in Crisis, Ingmar Bergman's directorial debut.

Personal life
Landgré was married to the Swedish actor Nils Poppe between 1949-1959. The couple had two children together, of whom one also became an actress. In the 1960s, she acted as a courier for her friend Andreas Papandreou, who later became the prime minister of Greece, by delivering microfilm to Greece.

Awards and honours
She won the Guldbagge Honorary Award in 2011, but received it in January 2012.

Selected filmography

References

External links

1927 births
Living people
Actresses from Stockholm
Litteris et Artibus recipients
20th-century Swedish actresses